The Lothrop Mansion, also known as the Alvin Mason Lothrop House, is an historic home, located at 2001 Connecticut Avenue, Northwest, Washington, D.C., in the Kalorama neighborhood.

Until a scale-back in Russian diplomatic presence in 2017, the Lothrop Mansion housed offices for the Russian Trade Representative.

History
The Beaux Arts home was designed by local architects Hornblower and Marshall, for Alvin Mason Lothrop, in 1908 at a cost of $100,000.

In 1942 the Soviet government bought the building from Nathaniel Luttrell, Jr., the grandson of the original inhabitant. While originally purchased to become the USSR embassy's chancellery, it would officially house the offices of the USSR Trade Representative until the end of the Soviet era.

The Lothrop Mansion is listed on the National Register of Historic Places, and is designated as a contributing property to the Kalorama Triangle Historic District. It is currently vacant.

See also
 National Register of Historic Places listings in the District of Columbia

References

External links

Houses completed in 1908
1908 establishments in Washington, D.C.
Beaux-Arts architecture in Washington, D.C.
Houses on the National Register of Historic Places in Washington, D.C.
Soviet Union–United States relations
Russia–United States relations
Russian-American culture in Washington, D.C.